Erich Gehmann (born 15 May 1922) is a German former sports shooter. He competed in the trap event at the 1968 Summer Olympics for West Germany.

References

1922 births
Living people
German male sport shooters
Olympic shooters of West Germany
Shooters at the 1968 Summer Olympics
Sportspeople from Freiburg (region)
Sportspeople from Mülheim